Sand City may refer to:

Sand City, a 2015 film made in Tamil as Manal Naharam
Sand City, California, a city on Monterey Bay
Sand City Station, a bus station